Ro 6-3129, also known as 16α-ethylthio-6-dehydroretroprogesterone or as 16α-ethylthio-9β,10α-pregna-4,6-diene-3,20-dione, as well as 16α-ethylthiodydrogesterone, is a progestogen of the retroprogesterone group which was developed by Roche but was never marketed. It shows greater potency than dydrogesterone in bioassays.

References

Abandoned drugs
Dienes
Diketones
Organosulfur compounds
Pregnanes
Progestogens
Thioethers